Patrick Clive Williams (born September 7, 1981) is an American mixed martial artist who formerly competed in the Bantamweight division of the Ultimate Fighting Championship. A professional competitor since 2010, he has also formerly competed for the Xtreme Fighting Championships in his native Florida.

Background
Born and raised in Miami alongside 11 other siblings, Williams began wrestling in middle school and was talented, going undefeated in his first two full seasons. At South Dade Senior High School, he was a two-time state champion and a runner-up. Williams also competed in track and field, lettering in three seasons. After attending Neosho County Community College in Chanute, Kansas for two years with one year yielding a third-place finish nationally, he later transferred to Arizona State University, competing for the Sun Devils. After a lackluster junior year where he finished with a 9–13 record, Williams came back his senior year and found more success; finishing at 29–14, and went undefeated 7–0 in conference dual matches. Williams graduated ASU with a degree in interdisciplinary studies, and worked as a case manager for a Dual Diagnostic Juvenile Detention Center.

Mixed martial arts career

Early career
After going 7-3 competing as a Featherweight in regional promotions, Williams signed on to compete in the UFC as a Bantamweight.

Ultimate Fighting Championship
At UFC 172, Williams lost to Chris Beal where Beal won the Performance of the Night award.

At UFC 188, Williams defeated Alejandro Pérez in 23 seconds.

After a more than 18-month layoff, Williams lost to Tom Duquesnoy at UFC on Fox 24.

Williams faced Luke Sanders on April 14, 2018, at UFC on Fox 29. He lost the fight via unanimous decision.

Mixed martial arts record

|Loss
| align=center|8–6
| Luke Sanders
| Decision (unanimous) 
| UFC on Fox: Poirier vs. Gaethje
| 
| align=center|3
| align=center|5:00
| Glendale, Arizona, United States
|
|-
| Loss
| align=center| 8–5
| Tom Duquesnoy
| TKO (elbows)
| UFC on Fox: Johnson vs. Reis
| 
| align=center| 2
| align=center| 1:05
| Kansas City, Missouri, United States
|
|-
| Win
| align=center| 7–5
| Alejandro Pérez
| Technical Submission  (guillotine)
| UFC 188
| 
| align=center| 1
| align=center| 0:23
| Mexico City, Mexico
|
|-
| Loss
| align=center| 6–5
| Chris Beal
| KO (flying knee)
| UFC 172
| 
| align=center| 2
| align=center| 1:51
| Baltimore, Maryland, United States
|
|-
| Win
| align=center| 6–4
| Rafael Dias
| TKO  (punches)
| Fight Time 17
| 
| align=center| 1
| align=center| 2:17
| Fort Lauderdale, Florida, United States
| 
|-
| Win
| align=center| 6–3
| Gabe Maldonado
| TKO (punches)
| XFC 24
| 
| align=center| 1
| align=center| 0:50
| Tampa, Florida, United States
| 
|-
| Loss
| align=center|5–3
| Pablo Alfonso
| KO (punch)
| CFA 8
| 
| align=center| 1
| align=center| 1:22
| Coral Gables, Florida, United States
| 
|-
| Win
| align=center| 5–2
| Luis Nazario
| Submission (rear-naked choke)
| Fight Time 9
| 
| align=center| 1
| align=center| 4:35
| Fort Lauderdale, Florida, United States
| 
|-
| Win
| align=center| 4–2
| Sebastian Angel
| TKO (broken jaw)
| CFA 6
| 
| align=center| 1
| align=center| 5:00
| Coral Gables, Florida, United States
|
|-
| Loss
| align=center| 3–2
| Ralph Acosta
| Submission (rear naked choke)
| UAF 1
| 
| align=center| 2
| align=center| 1:05
| Miami, Florida, United States
| 
|-
| Win
| align=center| 3–1
| Phil Gebauer
| Submission (rear naked choke)
| Fight Time 7
| 
| align=center| 2
| align=center| 4:17
| Fort Lauderdale, Florida, United States
| 
|-
| Win
| align=center| 2–1
| John McDowell
| Decision (unanimous)
| MFA: Generation 5
| 
| align=center| 3
| align=center| 5:00
| Miami, Florida, United States
| 
|-
| Loss
| align=center| 1–1
| Justin Linn
| Decision (split)
| MFA: New Generation 4
| 
| align=center| 3
| align=center| 5:00
| Miami, Florida, United States
|
|-
| Win
| align=center| 1–0
| Shaughn Koukos
| TKO (punches)
| FTP: Fight Time 1
| 
| align=center| 1
| align=center| 1:47
| Pompano Beach, Florida, United States
|

See also
 List of current UFC fighters
 List of male mixed martial artists

References

External links
 
 

1981 births
Living people
American male mixed martial artists
Featherweight mixed martial artists
Bantamweight mixed martial artists
Mixed martial artists utilizing collegiate wrestling
Mixed martial artists from Florida
Sportspeople from Miami
Ultimate Fighting Championship male fighters
American male sport wrestlers
Amateur wrestlers
South Dade Senior High School alumni
Neosho County Community College alumni